Viveash may refer to:

 Adi Viveash (born 1969), footballer
 Viveash, Western Australia